The hawthorn red midget moth (Phyllonorycter corylifoliella) is a moth of the family Gracillariidae. It is found in all of Europe.

The wingspan is 8–9 mm. The forewings are reddish-ocbreous, posteriorly or sometimes almost wholly suffused with blackish-grey blotches; a slender white median streak from base to near middle, with a marked sinuation downwards; a slender oblique white streak from middle of costa, and another from middle of dorsum; sometimes a whitish tornal dot and anteapical strigula. Hind wings grey or dark grey. The larva is pale yellowish; dorsal line green; head pale brownish.

Adults are on wing in May and again in August in two generations.

The larvae feed on Amelanchier lamarckii, Amelanchier ovalis, Betula pendula, Betula pubescens, Chaenomeles japonica, Cotoneaster nebrodensis, Crataegus laevigata, Crataegus monogyna, Cydonia oblonga, Malus domestica, Malus sylvestris, Mespilus germanica, Prunus avium, Pyrus amygdaliformis, Pyrus communis, Sorbus aria, Sorbus aucuparia, Sorbus domestica, Sorbus torminalis and Spiraea species. They mine the leaves of their host plant. They create a silvery, upper-surface, epidermal tentiform mine, which is centred over the midrib or a large lateral vein. The epidermis remains without folds until the mine becomes strongly contracted. Young mines have the appearance of a streak of silver on top of a vein.

References

External links
 
 
 bladmineerders.nl
 Fauna Europaea
 UKmoths

corylifoliella
Moths described in 1796
Moths of Europe
Taxa named by Jacob Hübner